Law and Disorder may refer to:

 Law and Disorder (1940 film), a British crime comedy starring Barry K. Barnes
 Law and Disorder (1958 film), a British comedy starring Michael Redgrave
 Law and Disorder (1974 film), an American comedy starring Carroll O'Connor
 Law and Disorder (TV series), a 1994 British sitcom
 Law and Disorder (radio program), an American legal-issues talk program
 "Law & Disorder", an episode of Homicide: Life on the Street
 "Law and Disorder", an episode of the American animated television series Johnny Bravo

See also 
 A series of documentary films by Louis Theroux:
 Law and Disorder in Johannesburg
 Law and Disorder in Lagos
 Law and Disorder in Philadelphia